Music Machine is the debut album by Melody Club released on December 26, 2002.

Track listing
All songs written by Kristofer Östergren.  Published by Air Chrysalis Scandinavia
"Covergirl"
"Stranded Love"
"Play Me In Stereo"
"Palace Station"
"Let's Kill the Clockwork"
"My Soft Return"
"Put Your Arms Around Me"
"Electric"
"Colours"
"Angeleyes"
"Golden Day"

Personnel
Kristofer Östergren: Vocals
Erik Stenemo: Acoustic and Electric Guitars
Jon Axelson: Keyboards, Synthesizers
Magnus Roos: Bass
Richard Ankers: Drums, Percussion

Chart positions

References

Melody Club albums
2002 debut albums